Fernand Rivers (born François Large, 6 September 1879, Saint-Lager - 12 September 1960) was a French actor, screenwriter, film producer and director. He was the brother of the actor Rivers Cadet.

Partial filmography

Director
 The Ironmaster (1933)
 Pasteur (1935)
 The Two Boys (1936) adaptation of the novel by Pierre Decourcelle
 Berlingot and Company (1939)
 Cyrano de Bergerac (1946)
 The Ironmaster (1948)
 The Ladies in the Green Hats (1949)

Producer
 Compliments of Mister Flow (1936)
 The Road to Damascus (1952)
 Adam Is Eve (1954)
 Blood to the Head (1956)

References

External links

1879 births
1960 deaths
People from Rhône (department)
French film directors
French male screenwriters
20th-century French screenwriters
French male film actors
French male silent film actors
French film producers
20th-century French male actors
20th-century French male writers